Mark Killian is an American politician and the director of the Arizona Department of Agriculture. Killian is a former Republican state representative and speaker of the Arizona House of Representatives.

Biography
Killian earned his BS in business administration from Arizona State University. From 1997 until 2003 Killian served as the Director of the Arizona Department of Revenue.
In 2010 Killian was appointed by then governor Jan Brewer to the Arizona Board of Regents.

During his 5-year term on the Board of Regents, Killian made headlines when he suggested the board sue the state for violating a clause in the state Constitution that says education should be "as nearly free as possible."

References

External links
 

Living people
Arizona State University alumni
Politicians from Phoenix, Arizona
Speakers of the Arizona House of Representatives
Republican Party members of the Arizona House of Representatives
State cabinet secretaries of Arizona
Year of birth missing (living people)